Worldpay Group plc (formerly RBS WorldPay) was a payment processing company. It was acquired by FIS in July 2019 for $43 billion. It was listed on the London Stock Exchange until 16 January 2018 when it was acquired by Vantiv to form Worldpay, Inc.

History

Early History 
WorldPay started as an online multi-currency payment system in 1997. The founder Nick Ogden partnered with National Westminster Bank to provide the financial systems and Andrew Birch of Symbiant to provide the end user payment gateway. When Royal Bank of Scotland took over National Westminster Bank, Worldpay was wholly acquired and merged with an electronic payment system called Streamline which was first released by Centre-file ltd, a wholly owned subsidiary of National Westminster Bank, in 1989.

Management History

RBS Ownership 

In 1995 the Streamline system was reabsorbed into the bank when the trading name and payroll service of Centre-file ltd were sold to Ceridian. NatWest was acquired in 2002 by Royal Bank of Scotland Group (RBS) which renamed the business RBS WorldPay and appointed Ron Kalifa as CEO. RBS expanded the business significantly by acquiring and merging a number of payment solutions companies from different countries. Over the next five years it was combined with seven leading retail payment solutions brands: Streamline, Streamline International, PaymentTrust, Netherlands based Bibit, RiskGuardian and US-based Lynk.

Divestment from RBS 

As a condition in the European Commission's clearance in December 2009 of state aid to RBS, Worldpay was to be sold as part of a plan to divest selected businesses from the group.  On 6 August 2010, Advent International and Bain Capital agreed to acquire Worldpay for £2.025bn, including a £200m contingent consideration, and appointed Ron Kalifa, who has previously headed up the global transaction services division with RBS, as CEO. The RBS Group retained a 20% stake in the newly independent business, with Advent International and Bain Capital owning 40% each. The sale completed on 1 December 2010.

In November 2013, RBS said it had sold its remaining stake of about 20 percent in Worldpay to the payment processing firm’s majority shareholders, private equity firms Advent International and Bain Capital. The company listed on the London Stock Exchange through an initial public offering (IPO) in October 2015. At the IPO, Advent and Bain earned a combined profit of £3.2 billion from their five year investment, selling about £1.2 billion of company stock and retaining a £2.3 billion stake.

Acquired by Vantiv 

In July 2017, Vantiv announced its intention to acquire Worldpay for $10.4 billion. The combined entity kept the "Worldpay" name, and was headquartered and listed in the United States, but internal operations continued to be based in the U.K. In August 2017, Vantiv announced that it would acquire Worldpay. The transaction was completed on 16 January 2018. There was initial concern from UK politicians over whether the merger was as a result of the fall in the pound's value since 2016, turning British assets into bargains for foreign investors. However, WorldPay's vice-chair, Ron Kalifa, described the deal as "a meger of equals" and emphasised that the timing was simply coincidental, as the company was "not ready [to do the deal] last year when the pound was in a different position."

Acquired by FIS 

In March 2019, Fidelity National Information Services (FIS), a payment rival based in Florida, bought Worldpay in a deal worth £32 billion.

Divestment from FIS 
In February 2023, in the wake of pressure from activist investors, FIS announced it would spin off its merchant business that consisted of Worldpay in the next 12 months.

Acquisitions 
On 21 December 2010, the UK division of Worldpay acquired Cardsave, one of the leading independent sales organisations distributing credit and debit card processing services to small retailers.

In May 2011 Worldpay acquired Envoy Services Limited, a leading provider of alternative payment solutions to eCommerce merchants worldwide, for an undisclosed amount.

In June 2013, Worldpay launched Worldpay Zinc, a mobile card processing terminal which connects to smart phones.

In September 2013, Worldpay revealed it had acquired US payment processing company Century Payments.

In 2014, Worldpay announced a definitive agreement to acquire SecureNet Payment Systems from private equity firm Sterling Partners. The acquisition was completed in December of that year. Following this acquisition, WorldPay announced that it would spend $10 million relocating its US headquarters to Atlanta.

Operations
The company provided payment services for mail order and Internet retailers, as well as point of sale transactions.  Customers are a mix of multinational, multichannel retailers, with the majority being small business merchants. It also provided loans to small businesses.

In 2016, WorldPay presented its own IT platform, which enabled the company to process up to 20 times more transactions. This decision was a part of the process to separate WorldPay entirely from the Royal Bank of Scotland and their technology systems.

See also
 Electronic commerce
 Payment gateway
 Payment processor
 Payment service provider

References

External links

Financial services companies established in 1989
Online payments
Payment service providers
Bain Capital companies
NatWest Group
2015 initial public offerings
2010 mergers and acquisitions
Companies formerly listed on the London Stock Exchange
2018 mergers and acquisitions